"Those Kinda Nights" is a song by American rapper Eminem from his eleventh studio album Music to Be Murdered By. It was released as the album's fifth track on January 17, 2020 via Shady Records along with the album. Recording sessions took place at Effigy Studios in Detroit with Mike Strange. Co-produced by Em, the production was handled by D.A Got That Dope with additional production by Fred Again. It features English singer-songwriter Ed Sheeran performing the hook, marking the third collaboration between the two artists, after 2017 "River" and 2019 "Remember The Name".

Personnel
Marshall Mathers – main artist, vocals, songwriter, co-producer
Ed Sheeran – featured artist, vocals, songwriter
David Domain – songwriter, producer
Fred Gibson – songwriter, additional producer
Luis Resto – songwriter, additional keyboards
Adrienne "Aeb" Byrne – songwriter, additional instruments & programming
Mike Strange – recording, mixing
Joe Strange – additional engineering
Tony Campana – additional engineering

Charts

Certifications

References

2020 songs
Eminem songs
Ed Sheeran songs
Songs written by Eminem
Songs written by Ed Sheeran
Songs written by Fred Again
Songs written by D.A. Got That Dope
Song recordings produced by Eminem
Songs written by Luis Resto (musician)